Mathilde Sussin (21 September 1876 – 2 August 1943) was an Austrian actress.

Sussin was born in Vienna into a Jewish family and died in 1943 at Theresienstadt concentration camp in Czechoslovakia.

Selected filmography
 The Black Tulip Festival (1920)
 To the Ladies' Paradise (1922)
 Das Haus ohne Lachen (1923)
 Die Buddenbrooks (1923)
 I.N.R.I. (1923)
 His Wife, The Unknown (1923)
 Tragedy in the House of Habsburg (1924)
 A Free People (1925)
 A Waltz-Dream (1925)
 The Woman Who Did (1925)
 Vater werden ist nicht schwer... (1926)
 People to Each Other (1926)
 One Does Not Play with Love (1926)
 The Famous Woman (1927)
 The Glass Boat (1927)
 U-9 Weddigen (1927)
 Assassination (1927)
 Violantha (1928)
 The Saint and Her Fool (1928)
 Refuge (1928)
 The Fourth from the Right (1929)
 Spring Awakening (1929)
 A Tango for You (1930)
 Flachsmann the Educator (1930)
 The Blue of Heaven (1932)
 The First Right of the Child (1932)

Bibliography
 Eisner, Lotte H. The Haunted Screen: Expressionism in the German Cinema and the Influence of Max Reinhardt. University of California Press, 2008.

External links

1876 births
1943 deaths
Austrian film actresses
Austrian silent film actresses
Actresses from Vienna
Austrian people who died in the Theresienstadt Ghetto
20th-century Austrian actresses
Jewish Austrian actresses